The Portland Trail Blazers (colloquially known as the Blazers) are an American professional basketball team based in Portland, Oregon. The Trail Blazers compete in the National Basketball Association (NBA) as a member of the league's Western Conference Northwest Division. The team played its home games in the Memorial Coliseum before moving to the Moda Center in 1995 (called the Rose Garden until 2013). The franchise entered the league as an expansion team in 1970, and has enjoyed a strong following: from 1977 through 1995, the team sold out 814 consecutive home games, the longest such streak in American major professional sports at the time, and only since surpassed by the Boston Red Sox. The Trail Blazers are the only NBA team based in the Pacific Northwest, after the Vancouver Grizzlies relocated to Memphis and became the Memphis Grizzlies in 2001 and the Seattle SuperSonics relocated to Oklahoma City and became the Oklahoma City Thunder in 2008.

The team has advanced to the NBA Finals three times, winning the NBA championship once in 1977. Their other NBA Finals appearances were in 1990 and 1992. The team has qualified for the playoffs in 37 seasons of their 51-season existence, including a streak of 21 straight appearances from 1983 through 2003, tied for the second longest streak in NBA history. The Trail Blazers' 34 playoff appearances rank third in the NBA only behind the Los Angeles Lakers and San Antonio Spurs since the team's inception in 1970. Six Hall of Fame players have played for the Trail Blazers (Lenny Wilkens, Bill Walton, Clyde Drexler, Dražen Petrović, Arvydas Sabonis, and Scottie Pippen). Bill Walton is the franchise's most decorated player; he was the NBA Finals Most Valuable Player in 1977, and the regular season MVP the following year. Four Blazers' rookies (Geoff Petrie, Sidney Wicks, Brandon Roy and Damian Lillard) have won the NBA Rookie of the Year award. Three players have earned the Most Improved Player award: Kevin Duckworth (1988), Zach Randolph (2004), and CJ McCollum (2016). Three Hall of Fame coaches – Lenny Wilkens, Jack Ramsay, and Rick Adelman – have patrolled the sidelines for the Blazers, and two others, Mike Schuler and Mike Dunleavy, have won the NBA Coach of the Year Award with the team.

History

1970–1974: Franchise inception

Sports promoter Harry Glickman sought a National Basketball Association (NBA) franchise for Portland as far back as 1955 when he proposed two new expansion teams, the other to be located in Los Angeles. When the Memorial Coliseum was opened in 1960 Glickman saw the potential it could serve as a professional basketball venue but it was not until February 6, 1970, that the NBA board of governors granted him the rights to a franchise in Portland. To raise the money for the $3.7 million admission tax, Glickman associated himself to real estate magnates Robert Schmertz of New Jersey, Larry Weinberg of Los Angeles and Herman Sarkowsky of Seattle. Two weeks later, on February 24, team management held a contest to select the team's name and received more than 10,000 entries. The most popular choice was "Pioneers", but that name was excluded from consideration as it was already used by sports teams at Portland's Lewis & Clark College. The name "Trail Blazers" received 172 entries, and was ultimately selected by the judging panel, being revealed on March 13 in the halftime of a SuperSonics game at the Memorial Coliseum. Derived from the trail blazing activity by explorers making paths through forests, Glickman considered it a name that could "reflect both the ruggedness of the Pacific Northwest and the start of a major league era in our state." Despite initial mixed response, the Trail Blazers name, often shortened to just "Blazers", became popular in Oregon.

Along with the Cleveland Cavaliers and Buffalo Braves (now Los Angeles Clippers), the Trail Blazers entered the NBA in 1970 as an expansion team, under coach Rolland Todd. Geoff Petrie and Sidney Wicks led the team in its early years, and the team failed to qualify for the playoffs in its first six seasons of existence. During that span, the team had three head coaches (including future hall-of-famer Lenny Wilkens); team executive Stu Inman also served as coach. The team won the first pick in the NBA draft twice during that span. In 1972, the team drafted LaRue Martin with the number one pick.

1974–1979: Bringing a championship to Portland
In 1974 the team selected Bill Walton from UCLA. The ABA–NBA merger of 1976 saw those two rival leagues join forces. Four ABA teams joined the NBA; the remaining teams were dissolved and their players distributed among the remaining NBA squads in a dispersal draft. The Trail Blazers selected Maurice Lucas in the dispersal draft. That summer, they also hired Jack Ramsay as head coach.

The two moves, coupled with the team's stellar play, led Portland to several firsts: winning record (49–33), playoff appearance, and an NBA championship in 1977. Starting on April 5 of that year, the team began a sellout streak of 814 straight games—the longest in American major professional sports history—which did not end until 1995, after the team moved into a larger facility.

The team started the 1977–78 season with a 50–10 mark, and some predicted a dynasty in Portland. However, Bill Walton suffered a foot injury that ended his season and would plague him over the remainder of his career, and the team struggled to an 8–14 finish, going 58–24 overall. In the playoffs, Portland lost to the Seattle SuperSonics in the 1978 conference semifinals. That summer, Walton demanded to be traded to a team of his choice (Clippers, Knicks, Warriors, or 76ers), because he was unhappy with his medical treatment in Portland. Walton was never traded, and he held out the entire 1978–79 season and left the team as a free agent thereafter. The team was further dismantled as Lucas left in 1980.

1980–1983: Transitioning
During the 1980s, the team was a consistent presence in the NBA post-season, failing to qualify for the playoffs only in 1982. However, they never advanced past the conference semifinals during the decade. The Pacific Division of the NBA was dominated by the Los Angeles Lakers throughout the decade, and only the Lakers and the Houston Rockets represented the Western Conference in the NBA Finals. Key players for the Blazers during the early 1980s included Mychal Thompson, Billy Ray Bates, Fat Lever, Darnell Valentine, Wayne Cooper, T. R. Dunn, Jim Paxson, and Calvin Natt.

1983–1995

Drafting Clyde Drexler

In the 1983 draft, the team selected University of Houston guard–forward Clyde Drexler with the 14th pick; "Clyde the Glide" would become the face of the franchise for over a decade, and the team's second-most decorated player (after Walton). In the next year's draft, the Trail Blazers landed the No. 2 pick in the NBA draft. After the Houston Rockets selected Drexler's college teammate Hakeem Olajuwon at No. 1, the Trail Blazers selected Kentucky center Sam Bowie. Drafting third, the Chicago Bulls selected Michael Jordan. The selection of the injury-plagued Bowie over Jordan has been criticized as one of the worst draft picks in the history of American professional sports. That summer, the Blazers also made a controversial trade, sending Lever, Cooper, and Natt to the Denver Nuggets for high-scoring forward Kiki Vandeweghe. In the 1985 draft, the Blazers selected point guard Terry Porter with the last pick of the first round. Porter would go on to become one of the top point guards in the league, and the Blazers' all-time leader in assists.

However, the Blazers continued to struggle in the post-season, and in 1986, Ramsay was fired and replaced with Mike Schuler. Despite this, they were the only team to beat the Boston Celtics on the road that season. That following off-season, the team drafted two players from behind the Iron Curtain, Arvydas Sabonis and Dražen Petrović, and sent Thompson to the San Antonio Spurs for former Oregon State University star Steve Johnson. Johnson was a high-scoring forward-center who the team intended to pair with Bowie on the frontline. It was not to be, as Bowie broke his leg five games into the 1986–87 season, missing the next two and a half seasons. During Schuler's brief tenure, the Blazers failed to advance out of the first round of the NBA playoffs.

Paul Allen ownership
In 1988, Microsoft co-founder Paul Allen purchased the Blazers for $70 million. At the time of the purchase, Allen, then 35, became the youngest team owner in the Big Four professional sports. His first season as owner was one marked by turmoil, as conflicts erupted over who should start at several positions. Both Vandeweghe and Johnson suffered injuries; they were replaced in the starting lineup by Jerome Kersey and Kevin Duckworth. Several players, most notably Drexler, were accused of undermining Schuler. The team went 25–22 to open the 1988–89 season, and Schuler was fired. He was replaced on an interim basis with assistant coach Rick Adelman, and Vandeweghe was traded to the New York Knicks. Under Adelman, the team went 14–21 to finish the season, and barely qualified for the playoffs. That off-season, the team traded Sam Bowie (who had returned to the team to end the season) to the New Jersey Nets for forward Buck Williams, and Adelman was given the coaching job on a non-interim basis.

Reaching the NBA Finals
The addition of Williams, and the replacement of the defensively challenged Vandeweghe with the defensive-minded Kersey, turned the team from a poor defensive squad into a good one. Led by Drexler, the team reached the NBA Finals in 1990 and 1992, losing to the Detroit Pistons and Chicago Bulls, respectively. Possibly inspired by the  Chicago Bears' "Super Bowl Shuffle", during the run-up to their 1990 Finals appearance, the Blazers recorded two songs: "Bust a Bucket" and "Rip City Rhapsody" (with music played and recorded by Josh Mellicker, "Rip City" being a reference to the city's nickname). The year in between their two finals appearances, the team posted a league-best 63–19 record before losing to the Los Angeles Lakers in the Western Conference finals. However, the team failed to win an NBA title, and failed to advance past the first round in 1993 and 1994. Adelman was fired after the 1994 season, and replaced with P. J. Carlesimo, which led to the resignation of executive vice-president Geoff Petrie, a close friend of Adelman's.

In July 1994, the Trail Blazers announced the hiring of a new team president, former Seattle SuperSonics general manager Bob Whitsitt. Whitsitt, known as "Trader Bob" for his penchant for making trades, immediately set about revamping the Blazers roster; this included dismantling the aging Drexler-led team that had twice been to the finals. Drexler requested to be traded to a contender, and the Trail Blazers traded him to the Houston Rockets. In the fall of 1995, the team left the Memorial Coliseum for a new home, the 20,000-seat Rose Garden Arena. The sellout streak ended in the new building.

1995–2006: Rebuilding and troubles
Several players left in free agency, including Terry Porter (1995), Buck Williams (1996), and Clifford Robinson (1997), which left Jerome Kersey unprotected in the 1995 expansion draft.

In an effort to rebuild, the team acquired several players who were highly talented, but had reputations for off-court troubles. Isaiah Rider, who was traded by the Minnesota Timberwolves for a draft pick and career backups due to his frequent arrests and lack of punctuality, was arrested for cannabis possession two days before his debut with the Blazers. Rasheed Wallace, who was acknowledged as a hot-tempered player since college, was also acquired, in a trade with the Washington Bullets. Point guard Kenny Anderson was signed as a free agent, and subsequently traded to the Toronto Raptors for Damon Stoudamire in February 1998 (the Raptors traded Anderson to the Boston Celtics five days later, because he did not want to play in Canada). Initially, this approach worked, as the team returned to the Western Conference finals in 1999 under head coach Mike Dunleavy. After being swept by the eventual champion San Antonio Spurs, Whitsitt sent Rider and guard Jim Jackson to the Atlanta Hawks for guard Steve Smith and acquired former All-Star forward Scottie Pippen from the Houston Rockets. The team again advanced to the Western Conference Finals, where they faced a Los Angeles Lakers team led by Shaquille O'Neal and Kobe Bryant. In that series, the Trail Blazers dropped three out of the first four games before winning the next two, forcing a pivotal Game 7. The Blazers had a 15-point lead in the fourth quarter, but lost the game and the series to the Lakers, who went on to win the first of three consecutive titles.

"The Jail Blazers"
The Trail Blazers made a series of personnel moves in the 2000 and 2001 off-seasons that failed to produce the desired results. Forward Jermaine O'Neal was traded to the Indiana Pacers for Dale Davis. Brian Grant signed with the Miami Heat, and was replaced with ex-Seattle forward Shawn Kemp. The team started off well, posting the Western Conference's best record through March 2001, and then signed guard Rod Strickland to augment their point guard corps. The move backfired, and the team lost 17 of its remaining 25 games, and was eliminated in the first round of the playoffs (swept by the Los Angeles Lakers). Some in the media began to criticize the team, and Whitsitt, previously proclaimed a genius for his work in both Seattle and Portland, was criticized. A particular criticism was that Whitsitt was attempting to win a title by assembling a roster of stars, without paying attention to team chemistry. Longtime NBA coach and analyst, Doug Collins, referred to Whitsitt as a "rotisserie-league manager." A fan was ejected from the Rose Garden for holding up a banner that said "Trade Whitsitt", and many in the national media started referring to the team as the "Jail Blazers" because of many players' off-court problems.

That offseason the churning continued; Dunleavy was fired, and replaced with Maurice Cheeks, a "players' coach" who some thought would relate better to the players than Dunleavy did. Cheeks brought on Dan Panaggio as assistant coach after a failed courtship with Henry Bibby of Southern California. More transactions followed as the Blazers traded Steve Smith to the Spurs for Derek Anderson. In one of his most controversial moves to that time, Whitsitt signed free agent Ruben Patterson, who had previously pleaded no contest to a felony sexual assault charge and was required to register as a sex offender. Popular center, Arvydas Sabonis, who had a towel flung in his face by Rasheed Wallace during the playoffs, decided to leave the team.

The next two seasons were just as disastrous for the team's reputation. Several players, including Wallace, Stoudamire, and Qyntel Woods, were cited for marijuana possession. Woods pleaded guilty to first-degree animal abuse for staging dog fights in his house, some involving his pit bull named Hollywood. Hollywood and Woods' other pit bull, Sugar, were confiscated, and Woods was given eighty hours of community service. He also agreed to donate $10,000 to the Oregon Humane Society. Wallace was suspended for seven games for threatening a referee. Zach Randolph and Patterson got in a fight during practice, with Randolph sucker punching his teammate in the eye, an injury which kept Patterson from making a meaningful contribution during the playoffs. When police came to Stoudamire's house to respond to a burglar alarm, they noticed the smell of marijuana, searched the premises, and found a pound of cannabis located in a crawlspace; the search was later declared illegal and charges in the matter were dropped. Guard Bonzi Wells famously told Sports Illustrated in a 2002 interview: "We’re not really going to worry about what the hell (the fans) think about us. They really don’t matter to us. They can boo us everyday, but they’re still going to ask for our autographs if they see us on the street. That's why they’re fans, and we’re NBA players." Wells was fined $50,000 by the Blazers for the statement.

Fan discontent soared; despite the team continuing to post a winning record, attendance at the Rose Garden started to decline. In the summer of 2003, with attendance declining, the team going nowhere on the court, and an exorbitant payroll, Whitsitt announced that he would leave the team to focus on Paul Allen's other franchise, the Seattle Seahawks.

To replace Whitsitt, the team hired two men at new positions. John Nash, a veteran NBA executive, was hired as general manager, and Steve Patterson as team president. The new management promised a focus on character while remaining playoff contenders; the team soon published a "25-Point Pledge" to fans. Troublesome players including Wells, Wallace, and Jeff McInnis were traded. However, the team failed to qualify for the 2004 NBA playoffs, ending a streak of 21 straight appearances.

The following year was marked by more trouble as the team plummeted to a 27–55 record. The bankruptcy of the Oregon Arena corporation, which resulted in the Rose Garden being owned by a consortium of investment firms, further alienated the fanbase, as did an incident in which forward Darius Miles (himself African-American) called coach Maurice Cheeks a "nigger", following it up with more racial invective when Cheeks sought out Nash, referring to Nash as Cheeks' "daddy." The latter incident was compounded by what many viewed as inadequate discipline for Miles, followed by a secret agreement between the team and Miles to refund the amount of his fine. Cheeks was fired that season and replaced on an interim basis by director of player-personnel Kevin Pritchard. That summer the team hired Nate McMillan, who had coached the Sonics the prior season, and Pritchard returned to the front office.

The following 2005–06 season was not better, as the Blazers posted a league-worst 21–61 record. Attendance was lower, and the year was not free of player incidents. Players such as Miles, Patterson, Randolph, and Sebastian Telfair were involved in either on-court bickering or off-court legal incidents. Nash was fired at the end of the season, with Steve Patterson assuming the general manager role in addition to his duties as president. In addition, the team had a poor relationship with the management of the Rose Garden, frequently complaining of a "broken economic model." It was widely speculated by the end of the year that Paul Allen would sell the team, and the team was offered for sale that summer, with several groups expressing interest. However, Allen was willing to spend money and urged Pritchard to make draft-day trades. He subsequently took the team off the market.

2006–2012: With Roy and Aldridge

In the 2006 NBA draft the Blazers traded Viktor Khryapa and draft rights for Tyrus Thomas for draft rights to LaMarcus Aldridge. The Blazers also traded for the sixth pick, Brandon Roy. In the spring of 2007, Steve Patterson resigned as team president, and Paul Allen entered into an agreement to re-purchase the Rose Garden. On the court, the team finished with a 32–50 record, an 11-game improvement, and rookie shooting guard Roy was named the 2006–07 Rookie of the Year. That summer Pritchard was promoted to general manager, and former Nike Inc. executive Larry Miller was hired as team president. The Blazers won the 2007 NBA draft lottery and selected Ohio State center Greg Oden with the No. 1 pick in the draft. Some had speculated that they might choose future MVP Kevin Durant instead; Durant was picked at No. 2 by regional rivals the Seattle SuperSonics. Oden suffered a pre-season knee injury requiring microfracture surgery, and missed the entire 2007–08 season. Oden's constant battle with injuries and Durant's success resulted in comparisons to the Blazers' selection of Sam Bowie over Michael Jordan in 1984.

Despite this, the Trail Blazers had a 13-game winning streak that began in early December, resulting in a 13–2 record, an NBA best for the month of December. Nate McMillan won NBA Coach of the Month honors, and Roy garnered NBA Western Conference Player of the Week honors in back-to-back weeks (the first Trail Blazers' player to accomplish the feat since Clyde Drexler in the 1990–91 season). Western Conference head coaches selected Roy to the 2008 NBA All-Star Game, the first All-Star for the Blazers since Rasheed Wallace in 2001. The Blazers finished the season 41–41, their best record since the 2003–04 season. Following the season, the Blazers became the only NBA team for the Pacific Northwest, as the Seattle SuperSonics moved to Oklahoma City.

During the 2008–09 season, after much waiting, Greg Oden debuted with the Blazers, playing in 61 games. Portland also added some international flavor to the team with the arrival of Spanish swingman Rudy Fernández, a member of the Spain national basketball team. French-native Nicolas Batum emerged as a skilled defensive forward who was inserted into the starting lineup as a rookie. Roy appeared in his second-straight All-Star Game, and Fernández competed in the Sprite Slam Dunk Contest during NBA All-Star Weekend. Roy had a career-high 52 points against the Phoenix Suns and game-winning shots against the Houston Rockets and New York Knicks. The Blazers clinched a playoff berth for the first time since 2003 and achieved a 54–28 record, their first winning record since the 2002–03 season. As the fourth seed and holding home court advantage, the Trail Blazers played the fifth-seeded Houston Rockets in the 2009 Playoffs, losing the playoff series 4 games to 2.

In the 2009 off-season, the Trail Blazers traded the No. 24 pick to Dallas for the No. 22 pick and selected Víctor Claver. They also selected Villanova forward Dante Cunningham with the No. 33 pick, Jon Brockman and guard Patrick Mills. Brockman was traded to the Kings in exchange for No. 31 pick Jeff Pendergraph. Free-agent Channing Frye signed with the Phoenix Suns and Sergio Rodríguez was traded to the Kings. The Blazers attempted to sign free agent small forward Hedo Türkoğlu, who led the Orlando Magic to the 2009 NBA Finals, but after a verbal agreement he decided to sign with the Toronto Raptors. The Blazers then attempted to sign restricted free agent Paul Millsap; however, their offer was matched by the Utah Jazz. On July 24, 2009, the Trail Blazers signed point guard Andre Miller.

Despite a winning record, injuries hobbled the team for the 2009–2010 season. Reserves Batum and Fernández started the season on the inactive list and forward Travis Outlaw soon followed after a serious foot injury early in the season. Most notably, centers Oden and Joel Przybilla suffered season-ending knee injuries, while Roy and Aldridge played through shoulder, hamstring, ankle and knee injuries. Head Coach Nate McMillan was likewise not spared, suffering a ruptured Achilles tendon during practice and was in a walking boot. Because of the void at the center position, Blazers general manager Kevin Pritchard worked out a deal to acquire Marcus Camby from the Los Angeles Clippers in exchange for Steve Blake and Outlaw. Although wins did not come as easily as the season before, the Blazers rallied to finish at 50–32, and finished 6th in the West. Roy underwent surgery after suffering a torn meniscus in his right knee, but returned for Game 4 of the first-round series against the Phoenix Suns. However, the accumulation of injuries was too much to bear, and the short-handed Trail Blazers lost the series 4–2 to the Suns.

During the 2010 off-season, the Blazers' front office experienced significant personnel changes beginning in July with the announcement of new general manager Rich Cho, succeeding former general manager Kevin Pritchard, who was relieved of his duties after the 2010 NBA draft. Cho became the first general manager of Asian descent in NBA history. On August 12, the Trail Blazers signed two new assistant general managers, Bill Branch and Steve Rosenberry. Branch and Rosenberry replaced former assistant general manager Tom Penn, who was released by Portland in March. The organization also made changes to Nate McMillan's coaching staff by hiring Bernie Bickerstaff, Bob Ociepka and Buck Williams, with Bickerstaff assuming the lead assistant coach position due to the departure of Monty Williams. The Blazers acquired rookies Armon Johnson, Luke Babbitt, and Elliot Williams from the 2010 NBA draft and off-season trades. On July 21, Wesley Matthews signed a five-year deal with the Blazers after his former team, the Utah Jazz, declined to match Portland's offer.
Similar to the previous season, Portland was overcome with injuries from the start of the 2010–11 season. Jeff Pendergraph and rookie guard Elliot Williams both suffered knee injuries that sidelined them for the season; Portland later waived Pendergraph. In November, they announced that Oden would have microfracture surgery on his left knee, ending his 2010–2011 season. This injury marked Oden's third NBA season cut short due to a knee injury. Three-time All-Star Brandon Roy underwent double-arthroscopic surgery on January 17, 2011, to repair both knees after dealing with constant struggles, leaving his future up in the air. Just days after, Marcus Camby also underwent arthroscopic knee surgery to repair his left knee.

Despite struggles with injury, Portland performed at a playoff level throughout the season. LaMarcus Aldridge emerged as the focal point of the team and posted career-high numbers, as well as Western Conference Player of the Week and Month honors. Wesley Matthews also emerged in the absence of Brandon Roy, proving his worth as the Blazers' key off-season addition. Believing the team could make a significant run in the playoffs, Cho executed his first major trade on February 24, 2011, just seven minutes before the deadline. The Trail Blazers sent forward Dante Cunningham, center Joel Przybilla and center Sean Marks to the Charlotte Bobcats in return for former All-Star and All-Defensive forward Gerald Wallace.
The emergence of Aldridge and the play of Matthews kept the Blazers competitive, sealing another playoff berth by winning 48 games. However, like in their last two postseasons, the Blazers were eliminated in six games of the first round, this time against the eventual champions, the Dallas Mavericks.

During the 2011 off-season, the Blazers released Cho, reportedly due to communication and "chemistry issues" with owner Paul Allen. Director of Scouting Chad Buchanan took over as acting interim General Manager. The dismissal of Cho was criticized by Sports Illustrated as "illogical", although they noted that Allen had done a lot of questionable moves during his tenure as team owner.

On June 23, 2011, in the NBA draft, the Trail Blazers drafted guards Nolan Smith from Duke University with the 21st selection and Jon Diebler from Ohio State University with the 51st selection. On the same day, the Blazers front office had made a three-team trade with the Denver Nuggets and Dallas Mavericks. The trade sent Blazers guards Andre Miller to Denver and Rudy Fernández to Dallas along with international player Petteri Koponen, who had yet to make an appearance for Portland; Denver then sent guard Raymond Felton to Portland and Denver also received rookie forward Jordan Hamilton from Dallas as well as a future second-round pick from Portland.

The 2011 lockout put transactions on hold until early December, and the Blazers were hit with three downfalls once the date came: Brandon Roy announced his retirement due to chronic knee problems, Greg Oden was diagnosed with yet another setback involving his ongoing knee issues, and LaMarcus Aldridge underwent heart surgery. Interim GM Chad Buchanan signed three free agents in the week before Portland's first exhibition game: Kurt Thomas, Jamal Crawford and Craig Smith.

In the shortened 2011–12 NBA season, the Blazers got off to a 7–2 start. But the team quickly began to collapse, as starting point guard Raymond Felton, among others, struggled with McMillan's new approach to a running-style offense. The team gained some notability as Aldridge was named to his first All-Star Game. Despite Aldridge's performance, the rest of the team became more inconsistent.

On March 15, 2012, the Trail Blazers made several moves, including two trades before the 3 pm EST deadline. Center Marcus Camby was sent to the Houston Rockets in exchange for center Hasheem Thabeet and point guard Jonny Flynn. Portland also received Houston's second-round draft pick in the 2012 NBA draft. Portland then traded forward Gerald Wallace to the New Jersey Nets for center Mehmet Okur, forward Shawne Williams, and New Jersey's first-round, top-3-protected pick in the 2012 NBA draft. All four players acquired in the trades held expiring contracts, meaning they would be free agents at the end of the season. Oden was released from the roster after playing a total of 82 games in five NBA seasons, being cut along with Chris Johnson in order to make room for the incoming traded players. Finally, head coach Nate McMillan was also fired, leaving the franchise with the third-most coaching wins, behind Jack Ramsay and Rick Adelman. Portland named Kaleb Canales as the interim head coach for the rest of the 2011–2012 NBA season. A few days later, Portland claimed forward J. J. Hickson off waivers from the Sacramento Kings. After shaking up the roster and limping to the end of the regular season with a 28–38 record and finishing out of playoff contention for the first time in three years, the team entered the offseason on the search for a general manager and new head coach.

At the 2012 NBA draft lottery on May 30, the Blazers secured the number 6 pick of the draft via the Brooklyn Nets from the Gerald Wallace trade, and also ended up with the number 11 pick due to their own record. Neil Olshey became the new GM in June, making it just over a year since the Blazers had had a non-interim general manager.

2012–present: The Damian Lillard Era

On June 28, 2012, the Blazers selected Weber State guard Damian Lillard and University of Illinois center Meyers Leonard with the 6th and 11th picks overall, respectively. They also selected University of Memphis guard Will Barton with the 40th pick overall, and traded the rights of the 41st overall pick, University of Kansas guard Tyshawn Taylor, to the Brooklyn Nets for cash considerations.

Headed by their new general manager Olshey, the Trail Blazers front office further made a few changes during July 2012. The Blazers signed their 30th pick from the 2006 draft, Joel Freeland, and their 22nd pick from the 2009 draft, Víctor Claver, as well as re-signing Hickson and Nicolas Batum. They also signed veteran point guard Ronnie Price to back up Lillard, who was selected as co-MVP of the 2012 Las Vegas Summer League. Dallas Mavericks assistant coach Terry Stotts was hired as head coach on August 7, 2012.

Under the reins of Lillard, the Blazers played well into January 2013, posting a 20–15 record. On January 11, 2013, at home against the Miami Heat, Wesley Matthews made two consecutive three-pointers late in the fourth quarter to help the Blazers secure a 92–90 victory. However, despite the Blazers remaining among the playoff contenders for most of the season, injuries to starters Batum, LaMarcus Aldridge, and Matthews, as well as a losing streak of 13 games – the longest in the franchise's history – led to the 11th position in the West, with a 33–49 record. Averaging 19.0 points, 6.5 assists, and 3.1 rebounds, Lillard was unanimously named Rookie of the Year, joining Ralph Sampson, David Robinson, and Blake Griffin as the only unanimous selections in NBA history.

Going into the 2013 NBA draft, the Trail Blazers held four picks: the 10th pick in the first round and three second-round picks. The Blazers selected guard CJ McCollum out of Lehigh University with their 10th pick, and also selected center Jeff Withey from Kansas, power forward Grant Jerrett from Arizona, and Montenegrin big man Marko Todorović. In addition, Cal guard Allen Crabbe was acquired from the Cleveland Cavaliers in exchange for two second-round picks, in the 2015 and 2016 drafts.

The Blazers finished the 2014 season with 21 more wins than the previous season, which amounted for the largest single-season improvement in franchise history. This included a period in November when they won 11 straight games, and 13–2 in the month overall, for which coach Terry Stotts took home Coach of the Month honors. On December 12, 2013, Aldridge scored 31 points and pulled down 25 rebounds in a home game against the Rockets, the first time a Trail Blazers' player recorded a 30-point, 25-rebound game. On December 14, 2013, the Blazers made a franchise-record 21 three-pointers against the Philadelphia 76ers. They tied the new record 19 days later against the Charlotte Bobcats, becoming the first NBA team to make 20 or more three-pointers in a game more than once in a season. Lillard was voted in as a reserve to his first All-Star game, joining Aldridge to represent Portland at the game. Portland finished 54–28, securing the fifth seed in the playoffs against the Rockets. The team also shot 81.5% at the free throw line, made 770 three-pointers, and started four players for all 82 regular-season games, all franchise records.

The first-round series against the Rockets was a tight one, with three of the six games going to overtime. The Blazers fared well in the first two games despite not having home-court advantage, beating Houston 122–120 and 112–105 in Games 1 and 2 respectively, fueled by Aldridge's 46 points and 18 rebounds in Game 1, and 43 points and 3 blocks in Game 2. In the sixth game of the series with the Rockets threatening to force a Game 7 back in Houston, down by two points with 0.9 seconds left in the game, Damian Lillard hit a buzzer-beating three-pointer to close out the series, and the Blazers advanced to the semifinals for the first time since 2000, where they lost to the eventual champion San Antonio Spurs in five games.

During the 2014 off-season, Olshey signed center Chris Kaman and two-time former Blazers' guard Steve Blake to bolster the bench. Expectations by sportswriters and analysts were high for the Trail Blazers going into the 2015 NBA season given their surprise success in 2013–14. The Blazers beat the reigning Northwest Division Champion Oklahoma City Thunder, 106–89, in their season opener at home on October 29, 2014. Like the season before, the Trail Blazers dominated the month of November, at one point winning nine straight games from November 9 to 26 before being defeated by the Memphis Grizzlies. Injuries, which had not been significant the previous season, started to inflict themselves on various players. Starting center Lopez fractured his right hand in a game against the Spurs on December 15, 2014, and missed the next 23 games. Initially, the Blazers were much unfazed, winning 129–119 in triple overtime against the Spurs on December 19, a game that saw Lillard and Aldridge combine for 75 points on 29 field goals; Lillard netted a career-high 43 points. Four days later, Lillard hit a three-pointer to tie the game and force overtime against the Thunder en route to 40 points and a 115–111 victory. Three Blazers went to New Orleans for the All Star Weekend: Matthews for the Foot Locker Three-Point Contest, Lillard as a reserve to the All-Star Game, and Aldridge as a starter to the All-Star game.

More injuries appeared around the start of the new year, which caused Aldridge, Batum, and Joel Freeland to miss various amounts of time, but none greater than Wesley Matthews' season-ending Achilles tendon tear on March 5, 2015. Called "the heart and soul" of the team by Aldridge, Matthews was in the midst of a career year when the injury occurred. In the first half of the season, the Blazers had a record of 30–11, allowed opponents to score an average of 97.0 points, and held them to 29.7% shooting on three-pointers; in the second half, the Blazers regressed to a 21–20 record, allowed 100.2 points, and let opponents shoot 37.9% from three. The Blazers clinched a return trip to the playoffs on March 30, 2015, defeating the Phoenix Suns, 109–86. Finishing the season 51–31, they clinched their first Northwest Division title since 1999 but fell to the Grizzlies in five games in the first round of the playoffs.

In the 2015 NBA draft, the Blazers selected Arizona forward Rondae Hollis-Jefferson and subsequently traded him to the Brooklyn Nets along with Steve Blake for center Mason Plumlee and the 42nd pick, Pat Connaughton.

After losing four of their five starters at the end of the 2014–15 season, the Blazers won 44 games, were the 5th seed in the Western Conference, and beat the Clippers in six games in the first round, but were eliminated by the Golden State Warriors in five games in the Conference Semifinals.

In May 2017, the team revealed their new logo, an update of the pinwheel design with a new wordmark. According to Chris McGowan, president and CEO of the Trail Blazers, "Together, we landed on subtle changes that provide a nod to our past while allowing us to modernize other aspects of our creative assets."

The 2017–18 season saw the Blazers finish with the third seed for the first time since the 1999–2000 season. On April 21, 2018, they were eliminated in the first round of the playoffs by the New Orleans Pelicans in a 4–0 sweep.

In the 2018–19 season, the Blazers finished the regular season as the third seed in the Western Conference for the second consecutive season. In the first round of the playoffs, the Trail Blazers defeated the favored Oklahoma City Thunder in five games, making it their first series win in three years. Game 5 of the series was tied 115–115 in the final seconds, but Damian Lillard sunk a 37-foot three-pointer at the buzzer to send the Thunder home. His shot also capped off a 50-point performance from Lillard. The first game victory over the Thunder on April 14, 2019, also marked the first playoff win for the team since 2016. In the second round of the playoffs, the team faced the Denver Nuggets. Game 3 of the series was the first quadruple overtime game in the NBA playoffs since 1953, while the Trail Blazers won, 140–137. The Trail Blazers won the series in seven games and advanced to the Western Conference Finals for the first time since 2000. In the Western Conference Finals, they faced the defending champion, the Golden State Warriors, and were swept in four games.

Following the suspension of the 2019–20 NBA season, the Blazers were one of the 22 teams invited to the NBA Bubble to participate in the final 8 games of the regular season. They erupted to number 8 but, after winning a "play-in game" over Memphis, were eliminated by Lakers in five games in the first round. The NBA decided that, at the end of the regular season part of "The Bubble" in Orlando, if the ninth seed was within four games of the eighth seed, the two teams would play at least one game. If the eighth seed won (as the Blazers did), then the play-in was over. If the ninth seed won, then another "winner-take-all" game would be played for the eighth seed. The NBA adopted a version of the play-in, a "tournament", for the postseason following the 2020–2021 season, which the Blazers avoided by finishing sixth. That play-in tournament will return for the postseason after the 2021–2022 season.

On June 4, 2021, following a first-round loss in the 2021 NBA playoffs to the Denver Nuggets, the team and head coach Stotts mutually agreed to part ways. After moving on from coach Stotts, the team hired Chauncey Billups as the franchises next head coach. 

On February 8, 2022, in the midst of a losing season filled with injuries, the Blazers elected to trade CJ McCollum to the New Orleans Pelicans. Without McCollum in the lineup, there was an opportunity for Anfernee Simons to lead the Blazers offense. Simons play for the remainder of the season, earned him a multi-year extension. 

On June 22, 2022, the Blazers received Detroit Pistons forward Jerami Grant in exchange for 2023 and 2025 draft picks. 

On June 23, 2022, in the 2022 NBA Draft, the Blazers selected guard Shaedon Sharpe out of the University of Kentucky and forward Jabari Walker from the University of Colorado with the 7th and 57th picks respectively.

Season-by-season record
List of the last five seasons completed by the Trail Blazers. For the full season-by-season history, see List of Portland Trail Blazers seasons.

Note: GP = Games played, W = Wins, L = Losses, W–L% = Winning percentage

Players

Current roster

Retained draft rights
The Trail Blazers hold the draft rights to the following unsigned draft picks who have been playing outside the NBA. A drafted player, either an international draftee or a college draftee who is not signed by the team that drafted him, is allowed to sign with any non-NBA teams. In this case, the team retains the player's draft rights in the NBA until one year after the player's contract with the non-NBA team ends. This list includes draft rights that were acquired from trades with other teams.

Retired numbers

Notes:
 1 As team owner and founder, the number is still available to players.
 2 Ramsay did not play for the team; the number represents the 1977 NBA Championship he won while coaching the Blazers.
 The NBA retired Bill Russell's No. 6 for all its member teams on August 11, 2022.

Basketball Hall of Famers

Naismith Memorial Basketball Hall of Fame

Notes:
 1 In total, Wilkens was inducted into the Hall of Fame three times: as player, as coach and as a member of the 1992 Olympic team.
 2 Inducted posthumously.
 3 In total, Drexler was inducted into the Hall of Fame twice: as player and as a member of the 1992 Olympic team.
 4 In total, Pippen was inducted into the Hall of Fame twice: as player and as a member of the 1992 Olympic team.
 5 Also played for the team (1970–1973).

FIBA Hall of Fame

Notes:
 1 Inducted posthumously.

Franchise leaders

NBA draft
The Trail Blazers have had the No. 1 pick in the NBA draft four times in their history; each time selecting a center. In 1972 the choice was LaRue Martin, Bill Walton was picked in 1974, Mychal Thompson in 1978, and Greg Oden was taken in 2007. Several Blazers' picks have been criticized by NBA commentators as particularly unfortunate:
 The selection of Martin over Bob McAdoo.
 The selection of center Sam Bowie with the No. 2 pick in the 1984 NBA draft over Michael Jordan (who was then picked next by the Chicago Bulls); other notable players taken later in that draft include future Hall-of-Famers Charles Barkley and John Stockton.
 The selection of Greg Oden over Kevin Durant in 2007.
 Other notable draft picks include player-coach Geoff Petrie, Sidney Wicks, Larry Steele, Lionel Hollins and Jim Paxson in the 1970s and Clyde Drexler, Jerome Kersey, Terry Porter and Arvydas Sabonis in the 1980s.
In the 1990s, the Blazers selected Jermaine O'Neal and in the modern millennium drafted Zach Randolph and, in 2006, acquired Brandon Roy and LaMarcus Aldridge in a draft day that included six trades involving the Trail Blazers.

Team branding

The team's colors are red, black, and white. The team's "pinwheel" logo, originally designed by the cousin of Glickman, is a graphic interpretation of two five-on-five basketball teams lined up against each other. One side of the pinwheel is red; the other side is black or white. The logo has gone from a vertical alignment to a slanted one starting in the 1991 season, creating a straight edge along the top

The Blazers' initial uniforms were white at home and red on the road. The 1970–1975 design featured a swooping tail accenting the last letter ('blazers' on the home uniforms; 'Portland' on the road uniforms). The 1975–1977 uniforms featured the team name written vertically on the right side; this uniform was used in their 1977 championship season.

Following their championship victory, the Blazers unveiled what is now their most iconic look, featuring a "blaze" strip that runs diagonally down the uniform. The team also switched their road uniforms to black. The 1977–1991 set featured lowercase lettering, while a red uniform was used in lieu of the black uniforms from 1979 to 1985. Following a redesign in the 1991–92 season, the Blazers updated their look to feature uppercase letters. A 2002–03 rebrand saw the team add silver accents and introduce a red alternate uniform, while a slight change in the 2005–06 season saw the Blazers return to the city name on their road uniforms.

The 2009–10 season saw the Blazers unveil a fourth alternate uniform, a design that features the team's 'Rip City' nickname and a more subtle version of the "blaze" on the side. This uniform was tweaked to include sleeves in the 2014–15 season. For the 2012–13 season, the Blazers changed their red alternate uniform to include black lettering, a more modernized "blaze" strip, and the pinwheel logo atop of it.

For the 2017–18 season, the Blazers made some slight revisions to their look upon moving to Nike, changing the alignment of the city and team name from italicized to straight while adding the 'Rip City' nickname on the waistband. They also changed their red alternate uniform to include a black and grey variation of the "blaze" strip inspired from the team's pinwheel logo and a lack of white elements. In the 2019–20 season, the red "Statement" uniform was updated to feature white letters, white numbers with black trim and a thin white strip above the series of black and grey strips. This was due to visibility concerns surrounding the previous red uniform. Then in the 2022–23 season, in collaboration with Damian Lillard, the Trail Blazers updated their "Statement" uniform, only featuring the iconic "pinwheel" logo in black along with black/red side striping inspired by the aforementioned logo.

In addition to the "Association", "Icon" and "Statement" uniforms, Nike released annual "City" uniform designs. The Blazers' 2017–18 "City" uniforms were predominantly black with a grayscale plaid pattern (in homage to former head coach Jack Ramsay), 'Rip City' and lettering in red, and a silhouette of the Portland city flag on the beltline. The 2018–19 season "City" uniforms again used the 'Rip City' concept, this time with a more subdued red "blaze" strip and black and dark grey background. In addition, the Blazers wore an "Earned" uniform by virtue of qualifying in the 2018 playoffs. The uniforms were similar to the 'Rip City' jerseys but with a red base and white letters with black trim. The "Earned" jersey was only used for that season before it was shelved permanently. The 2019–20 "City" uniform was heavily inspired by the team's original white uniforms, featuring 'Rip City' and block numerals in red with black trim, along with player names in black. In the 2020–21 season, the Blazers' "City" uniform will pay homage to the Oregon landscape and its native tribes. The uniform features a brown base with black lines similar to a wood grain, a series of zig-zag lines in shades of red, blue, yellow and orange along the right side, and the "Oregon" insignia found on the White Stag sign. The waist also includes the Oregon outline and nine blue triangles symbolizing the state's native tribes. As in 2019, the Blazers also wore an "Earned" uniform after qualifying in the 2020 playoffs. The uniforms were patterned after the team's "Association" uniform but lacked the red elements and had a silver base. For the NBA's 2021–22 75th anniversary season, the Blazers' "City" uniform was a mixture of past uniform elements. Once again going to the 'Rip City' concept, this uniform featured the same number font as the 1991–2002 uniforms, the red and gray plaid striping in homage to Jack Ramsay, the "Portland" script from the team's first uniforms on the waist, tributes to Portland's 'City of Roses' moniker and the team's 1977 championship and 1990 and 1992 conference titles, and a white circle surrounding the current logo in homage to the center court of Veterans Memorial Coliseum.

For the Trail Blazers' 2022–23 "City" uniform, the team went with a black uniform with teal and silver accents, replacing the trademark diagonal strip with a pattern inspired by the carpet found on the Portland International Airport. "PDX" in silver letters was positioned above the uniform.

The team's mascot is Blaze the Trail Cat, a two-tone silver-colored mountain lion, which has been the team's official mascot since 2002.

The concept was pitched to the Trail Blazers front office by Jay Isaac of Isaac-Ross Productions. On March 22, 1989, following a 151–127 victory over Portland, Golden State Warriors head coach Don Nelson protested to the media about a skit during a timeout, in which Bigfoot crushed a model of the Golden Gate Bridge while the song "I Left My Heart in San Francisco" played over the public address system. Bigfoot was discontinued as Portland's mascot following the incident. A popular unofficial mascot was the late Bill "The Beerman" Scott, a Seattle beer vendor-cheerleader who worked for numerous pro teams, including the Trail Blazers, the Seattle Seahawks, and the Seattle Mariners. Scott worked for the Trail Blazers from 1981 through 1985.

Front office

The team from 1988 until 2018 was owned by Microsoft co-founder Paul Allen; ownership of the Trail Blazers is currently via a series of holding companies which Allen owned. Vulcan Inc. is a private corporation in which currently Allen's sister Jody Allen as head of Paul Allen's estate is the chairman and sole shareholder. A subsidiary of Vulcan, Vulcan Sports and Entertainment (VSE), manages Allen's sports-related properties, including the Trail Blazers, the Seattle Seahawks NFL team, Seattle Sounders FC of MLS, and the Moda Center. In the fall of 2012, Peter McLoughlin was named CEO of Vulcan Sports and Entertainment.

The Trail Blazers as a corporate entity are owned by VSE. Jody Allen as head of estate serves as the team's chairman, and her longtime associate Bert Kolde is vice-chairman. The position of president and chief executive officer is held by Chris McGowan, with Larry Miller having held the job until resigning in July 2012. The post of chief operating officer is vacant; the most recent COO of the team was Mike Golub, who resigned in July 2008 to take a more enhanced role with VSE. Kevin Pritchard served as general manager of the Trail Blazers until he was fired on June 24, 2010. The announcement was issued by the Blazers' head office just an hour before the beginning of the 2010 NBA draft. A month later, the Blazers named Oklahoma City Thunder assistant general manager Rich Cho as their new general manager. Cho was fired less than a year later, and director of college scouting Chad Buchanan served as interim general manager for the entire 2011–12 season. In June 2012, the Trail Blazers hired Neil Olshey as general manager.

Before Allen purchased the team in 1988, the Trail Blazers were owned by a group of investors headed by Larry Weinberg, who is chairman emeritus.

Venues

The Trail Blazers play their home games in the Moda Center, a multipurpose arena which is located in Portland's Rose Quarter, northeast of downtown. The Moda Center, originally named the Rose Garden, opened in 1995 and can seat a total of 19,980 spectators for basketball games; capacity increases to 20,580 with standing room. Like the Trail Blazers, the Moda Center is owned by Paul Allen through subsidiary Vulcan Sports and Entertainment. During a two-year period between 2005 and 2007, the arena was owned by a consortium of creditors who financed its construction after the Oregon Arena Corporation, a now-defunct holding company owned by Allen, filed for bankruptcy in 2004. In August 2013, the arena's name was changed from the Rose Garden to the Moda Center, after the Blazers' front office officials reached a $4 million agreement with Moda Health Corporation. The name change was met with considerable criticism from fans.

Prior to 1995, the Trail Blazers' home venue was the Memorial Coliseum, which today stands adjacent to the Moda Center. This facility, built in 1960, can seat 12,888 spectators for basketball (originally 12,666). It was renamed the Veterans Memorial Coliseum in 2011.

In-game entertainment
The team has a cheerleading-dance squad known as the BlazerDancers. Consisting of 16 members, the all-female BlazerDancers perform dance routines at home games, charity events, and promotional events. The 2008–2009 team held auditions in late July 2008. Seven new dancers, as well as nine returning dancers, made up the new team. A junior dance team composed of 8- to 11-year-old girls also performs at selected home games, as does a hip hop dance troupe. Other regular in-game entertainment acts include a co-educational acrobatic stunt team which performs technically difficult cheers, a break dancing squad known as the Portland TrailBreakers, and a pair of percussion acts.

Fan support and "Blazermania"
The relationship between the team and its fans, commonly known as "Blazermania", has been well-chronicled. The Trail Blazers have long been one of the NBA's top draws, with the exception of two periods in the team's history. The team drew poorly during its first four seasons of existence, failing to average more than 10,000 spectators per game. Attendance increased during the 1974–75 season, when the team drafted Bill Walton.

The phenomenon known as Blazermania started during the 1976–77 season, when the team posted its first winning record, made its first playoff appearance, and captured its only NBA title, defeating the heavily favored Philadelphia 76ers in the NBA Finals; the team has been popular in Portland since that time. That season, the team started a sellout streak which continued until the team moved into the Rose Garden in 1995. The team continued to average over 19,000 spectators per game until the 2003–04 season, when attendance declined after the team continued to suffer image problems due to the "Jail Blazer" reputation it had gained, and was no longer as competitive on the court. After drafting eventual Rookie of the Year and three-time All Star Brandon Roy in 2006, attendance climbed in the 2006–07 season and continued to rebound in the 2007–08 season. The final 27 home games of the 2007–2008 season were consecutive sell-outs, a streak that continued through the entire 2008–2009 season and into the start of the 2011–2012 season.

The team's rallying cry, "Rip City," was coined by Schonely during the team's first season and remains an integral part of the team's and fanbase's identity.

Media

Television

The Trail Blazers' former television play-by-play team was Mike Barrett and Mike Rice, joined by sideline reporter Michael Holton, who succeeded Terry Porter (2010–11) and Rebecca Haarlow (2009–10). The team was also known for its long association with Steve "Snapper" Jones, who played for the team prior to his career as a television analyst; Jones departed the franchise in 2005.

Regional television coverage of Trail Blazers games was limited until the 1980s, with only closed-circuit broadcasts at the Paramount Theatre available by the mid-70s. In the 1980s, the team reached an agreement with KOIN to carry games on television; to protect the team's ticket sales, the package was largely limited to away games. The telecasts also had to be scheduled around CBS network programming that could not be pre-empted, such as 60 Minutes.

In the 1990s, the team split its home games between broadcast television (with KGW serving as flagship station by 2000) and a pay-per-view service known as BlazerVision; the team did not disclose how many viewers subscribed to the service, while Portland Business Journal writer Andy Giegerich criticized the service when it was assigned early-round playoff games in the 1999–2000 season (thus resulting in blackouts of TNT's national coverage), and anecdotally noted that the Trail Blazers lost more often in games that were on BlazerVision or otherwise untelevised. The service was discontinued for the 2000–01 season, with the Trail Blazers replacing it with games syndicated to cable providers.

In the 2001–02 season, the team established its own regional sports network, Action Sports Cable Network (ASCN), which would carry the majority of Trail Blazers telecasts. AT&T Broadband refused to add the new channel due to the carriage fees it charged, which prevented it from reaching a wide audience. After having to resort to providing closed circuit feeds directly to bars, and sublicensing a package of games to the local PAX TV station, ASCN folded after one season. The team reached agreements with FSN Northwest (now Root Sports Northwest) and KGW to carry its regional broadcasts. It was alleged that the 2005 departure of Steve Jones from the commentary team was due in part to team displeasure with Jones' sometimes frank analysis of the team's on-court performance and off-court decisions.

In the 2007–08 season, the team moved to Comcast SportsNet Northwest (now NBC Sports Northwest); all but six regular-season games were carried on CSN Northwest or the Blazers Television Network (a syndication package within the team's television market, whose flagship was KGW); 34 games were produced and broadcast in high-definition. The team's television contract with CSN Northwest was criticized due to the channel's lack of carriage on satellite television providers DirecTV and Dish Network, both of which compete with Comcast's cable television operations.

On July 6, 2016, the team renewed its contract with CSN Northwest through the 2020–2021 season, giving the network exclusive rights to all Trail Blazers games beginning in the 2017–18 season (and thus ending the team's over-the-air syndication package). The team had originally considered an arrangement with KPTV, under which games would be broadcast over-the-air and simulcast via an Internet service, but deals with potential streaming partners fell through. Root Sports Northwest made a higher-value, long-term offer, but the offer was rejected because Root Sports could not guarantee whether its carriage deal with Comcast Cable, which serves 55% of the Portland market, would be renewed. On November 2, 2017, NBC Sports Northwest launched a paid over-the-top service, Blazers Plus, offering access to 15 games through the remainder of the season.

On June 16, 2016, The Oregonian reported that Barrett, Rice, and analyst Antonio Harvey had been released by the Trail Blazers. Wheeler will call games on radio alone, while the three former personalities still received pay for the final season of their contracts. The change came as part of a plan by the team to overhaul its telecasts as it enters the final year of its current television deal with CSN Northwest. The next day, the team announced that veteran sportscaster Kevin Calabro would become its new lead commentator beginning in the 2016–17 season. On July 1, 2020, Kevin Calabro announced his departure as TV play-by-play broadcaster. Jordan Kent, the main host for the Blazers TV studio show, was named interim TV play-by-play broadcaster and in November 2020 was named the full-time TV play-by-play broadcaster starting with the 2020–2021 season. However, Calabro resumed calling Trail Blazers games after an absence of only one season. Calabro's current partners are color commentator Lamar Hurd, and sideline reporter Brooke Olzendam.

Prior to the 2021–22 season, the Trail Blazers announced that they would return to Root Sports Northwest under a multi-year deal of undisclosed length. A key factor in the deal was reported to be the network's wider carriage over NBC Sports Northwest, which included greater coverage on streaming and satellite providers (including DirecTV and Dish Network, although the latter's contract with Root Sports and several other AT&T SportsNet channels expired at the end of September 2021, with no renewal).

Radio 
All Trail Blazers' games are broadcast over the radio, with broadcasting carried on the Trail Blazers radio network, which consists of 25 stations located in the Pacific Northwest. The flagship station of the Blazers' radio network is 620 KPOJ in Portland. The radio broadcasting team consists of play-by-play announcer Travis Demers and studio host Jay Allen. All games are preceded by a pre-game analysis show, Blazers Courtside, and followed by a post-game show known as The 5th Quarter. Bob Akamian served as studio host until halfway through the 2010–2011 season, when the team hired away Adam Bjaranson from their over-the-air TV partner, KGW, and former Trail Blazers' player Michael Holton is the studio analyst. The original radio announcer for the team was Bill Schonely, who served as the team's radio play-by-play announcer from 1970 until 1992 and from 1994 until his retirement (he did Trail Blazers TV games with Jones from 1992 to 1994) in 1998—calling 2,522 Blazers games—and remains with the team as a community ambassador. Brian Wheeler then did play-by-play from 1998 to 2019.

Press relations

Several local news outlets provide in-depth coverage of the Trail Blazers. Chief among them is The Oregonian, the largest paper in the state of Oregon. Other newspapers providing detailed coverage of the team (including the assignment of beat writers to cover the team) include the Portland Tribune, a weekly Portland paper, and the Vancouver, Washington Columbian. Notable local journalists to cover the team include John Canzano of the Oregonian, Jason Quick of The Athletic, and Dwight Jaynes of the Portland Tribune. Online coverage of the Oregonian is provided through OregonLive.com, a website collaboration between the paper and Advance Internet. In addition to making Oregonian content available, oregonlive.com hosts several blogs covering the team written by Oregonian journalists, as well as an additional blog, "Blazers Blog", written by Sean Meagher.

Relations between the team and The Oregonian have often been tense; the paper is editorially independent of the team and is often critical. During the Steve Patterson era, relations between the two institutions became increasingly hostile; several NBA executives told ESPN's Chris Sheridan that the situation was the "most dysfunctional media-team relationship" that they could recall. For instance during a portion of a pre-2006 NBA draft workout, which was closed to the media, an Oregonian reporter looked through a curtain separating the press from the workout and wrote about this on his blog. Outraged, the team closed subsequent practices to the press altogether, leading John Canzano of the paper to respond with outrage on his blog. In November 2006, the Oregonian commissioned an outside editor to investigate the deteriorating relationship, a move the rival Willamette Week called "unusual". In the report, both sides were criticized somewhat, but did not make any revelations which were unexpected.

Additional coverage is offered by various blogs, including Blazers Edge (part of SB Nation) and the Portland Roundball Society (part of ESPN's TrueHoop Network).

See also

 1970 NBA Expansion Draft
 Bulls vs. Blazers and the NBA Playoffs
 List of Portland Trail Blazers accomplishments and records
 List of Portland Trail Blazers head coaches
 List of Portland Trail Blazers seasons
 Lakers–Trail Blazers rivalry
 Memorial Day Miracle
 Portland Fire
 Portland Trail Blazers draft history
 Sports in Portland, Oregon
 SuperSonics–Trail Blazers rivalry

References

External links

 

 
1970 establishments in Oregon
Basketball teams established in 1970
National Basketball Association teams
Trail Blazers